Beek is a village in the Dutch province of Gelderland. It is located in the municipality of Berg en Dal, about 5 km east of Nijmegen. It was sometimes referred to as "Beek (bij Nijmegen)" or "Beek-Ubbergen" because there are many villages called Beek.

History 
It was first mentioned in 814-815 as Bechi, and means brook. The village dates from the early Middle Ages and was an agricultural community. In the 19th century, it developed into a villa ward. The tower of the Saint Bartholomew's Church has elements which are probably from the 11th century. The current layout dates from 1650. Between 1948 and 1950, it was extensively repaired due to war damage. In 1840, it was home to 715 people.

Beek was a separate municipality until 1 January 1818, when municipality Beek fused with "Ooij en Persingen" forming municipality Ubbergen.

On 1 January 2015 "Ubbergen", "Groesbeek" and "Millingen aan de Rijn" fused and named municipality Berg en Dal as of 1 January 2016.

Nature 
The Kabouterboom is a chestnut (castanea sativa) in the valley of Beek. The tree dates from the 17th century, and has a trunk of 8 to 9 metres, and is the thickest tree of the Netherlands.

Notable people 
 Sebastiaan Tromp (1889–1975), Jesuit priest, theologian
 Berend-Jan van Voorst tot Voorst (born 1944), politician

Gallery

References

Populated places in Gelderland
Former municipalities of Gelderland
1818 disestablishments
Geography of Berg en Dal (municipality)